Plants vs. Zombies Heroes is a digital collectible card game in the Plants vs. Zombies series, developed by PopCap Games and published by Electronic Arts. On March 10, 2016, it underwent a soft launch in some countries on iOS, before being internationally released on October 18, 2016. This is the first mobile release in the Plants vs Zombies series in which players can play on either the Plant team or the Zombie team.

Gameplay 

In Plants vs. Zombies Heroes, each player begins with a deck of 40 cards which they have selected beforehand, using cards from their collection. The playing area has five lanes, some of which may be elevated or filled with liquid. A card can be placed in any empty lane (unless the card has the trait "Team Up", in which case 1 "Team Up" card can be played in the same lane as a regular card with the maximum being 2 cards per lane). Only "Amphibious" cards can be placed in liquid-filled lanes. Each card has a different cost to play and as in the previous games in the series, the Plant player uses a currency of suns and the Zombies use brains. Each player and card has a certain amount of health, and will be defeated if they lose their health. Each round consists of four phases: Zombies Play, Plants Play, Zombie Tricks and Fight. When one of the players' life reaches 0, the opposing player wins. Both the plants and the zombies have 11 (previously 10, before the Galactic Gardens update) playable heroes, each of which have their own unique characteristics, some of them were originally seen in Plants vs. Zombies: Garden Warfare 2, Plants vs. Zombies 2: It's About Time or Plants vs. Zombies Adventures. Various quests, rewards and challenges are available which allow the player to earn in-game currency that enables obtaining more cards for their collection. Cards may also have traits. These allow them to have special abilities, such as damaging multiple enemies, healing, being immune to tricks, etc. In-app purchases are available as well.

While the game may appear similar to Hearthstone, it has features that make it distinct. The first of these is the comic book style art design which along with the soundtrack game creates a very different atmosphere than the one found in Hearthstone. Most Plants and Zombies can only attack enemies in their lane. Heroes have a "block meter" used to block attacks. In addition, the in-game currencies can be earned more easily and faster than in Hearthstone. By watching advertisements or completing quests, users can unlock packs at a higher rate than they would have been able to in Hearthstone.

Card Set
The following table lists the card set releases by their name, type, date of release, and card count.

Other than the cards from these sets, there are superpower cards, basic cards, and event cards.

Basic cards are given once a character class is unlocked. Players can gain event cards from weekly events. Finishing daily challenges and daily wins earns tickets, which can be used to buy event cards. Currently, there are 31 plant event cards and 32 zombie event cards.

Reception 

Plants vs. Zombies Heroes was released to positive reviews from critics, garnering a rating of "generally favorable" on the review aggregator website Metacritic.

References

External links 
 

2016 video games
Android (operating system) games
IOS games
Multiplayer and single-player video games
Digital collectible card games
Heroes
PopCap games
Video games about plants
Video games developed in the United States
Video games about zombies